Bilateral relations between Bangladesh and Palestine are close and considered to be cordial. Bangladesh has been a consistent supporter of the Palestinian campaign for an independent state, and has no diplomatic relations with Israel. Furthermore, Bangladesh offers scholarships to young Palestinians, and the two countries co-operate on military affairs.

History
Prior to Bangladeshi independence, many East Pakistanis (Bangladeshis) volunteered to fight in the 1948 Arab–Israeli War. The relationship between Bangladesh and Palestine, particularly the Palestinian Liberation Organization (PLO), can be traced back to the Bangladesh Liberation War in 1971. At first, most Arab states were hesitant to recognize the newly established state of Bangladesh, but relations warmed in 1973 when Bangladesh supported the Palestinians' against Israel during the Yom Kippur War in 1973, including sending a medical team and relief supplies for Palestinians.

The first high-level meeting between the two countries took place in 1974, when Yasser Arafat met Prime Minister Sheikh Mujibur Rahman in Lahore at the second summit of the Organization of Islamic Cooperation (OIC). A relationship with the Palestinian Liberation Organization (PLO) was established around that time period, in which Bangladesh opened a PLO office in the capital, Dhaka, and PLO officials were frequent guests at events hosted by the Bangladeshi political and diplomatic corps.

In 1980 a postal stamp was created depicting a Palestinian freedom fighter, the Al-Aqsa mosque in the background shrouded by barbed wire, and text celebrating Palestinian fighters as "valiant" in English and Arabic.

Yasser Arafat visited Bangladesh several times between 1970s and 1990s. He usually received a warm welcome from Bangladeshi media, political circles, and the general public. According to a September 1988 US Library of Congress report, the Bangladeshi government reported in 1987 that 8,000 Bangladeshi youths had volunteered to fight for the PLO following this visit. Since the 1980s, under International Military Education and Training (IMET), there has been development of military ties between the PLO and Bangladesh, with PLO soldiers attending one-year courses at the Bangladesh Military Academy in Chittagong.

Current relations
Nowadays, relations between Bangladesh and Palestine are cordial; Bangladesh is a strong and consistent advocate for an independent Palestinian state and firmly opposed to Israeli occupation. Bangladesh has a complete ban on trade (indirect and direct) with Israel and does not have any diplomatic relations with Israel. Bangladesh supports the establishment of a Palestinian state drawn on the 1967 boundary with Jerusalem as the capital.

Bangladesh offers scholarship for Palestinian students in medical colleges in Bangladesh and Palestinian army officers are provided training in Bangladeshi military facilities.

In December 2016 Bangladesh signed a memorandum of understanding with Palestine on trade and energy cooperation.  Palestinian President Mahmoud Abbas visited Dhaka in February 2017.

Palestine is represented in Bangladesh by the Embassy of the State of Palestine in Dhaka. Yousuf S Ramadan is the incumbent Palestinian Chargé d'Affaires in Dhaka.

See also
 Foreign relations of Bangladesh
 Foreign relations of Palestine

References

Palestine
Bilateral relations of the State of Palestine
Bangladesh–State of Palestine relations